Gymnopleurus is a genus of Scarabaeidae or dung beetles in the superfamily Scarabaeoidea.

Species
 Gymnopleurus aciculatus Gebler, 1841
 Gymnopleurus aenescens Wiedemann, 1821
 Gymnopleurus aeruginosus Harold, 1867
 Gymnopleurus andreaei Ferreira, 1954
 Gymnopleurus asperrimus Felsche, 1909
 Gymnopleurus atratus Klug, 1845
 Gymnopleurus bicallosus Felsche, 1909
 Gymnopleurus bicolor Latreille, 1823
 Gymnopleurus biharensis Arrow, 1931
 Gymnopleurus bombayensis Arrow, 1931
 Gymnopleurus coerulescens (Olivier, 1789)
 Gymnopleurus colmanti Janssens, 1938
 Gymnopleurus cyaneus (Fabricius, 1798)
 Gymnopleurus deperditus Heer, 1862
 Gymnopleurus elegans Klug, 1845
 Gymnopleurus eocaenicus Meunier, 1921
 Gymnopleurus flagellatus (Fabricius, 1787)
 Gymnopleurus foricarius Garreta, 1914
 Gymnopleurus fulgidus (Olivier, 1789)
 Gymnopleurus gemmatus (Harold, 1871)
 Gymnopleurus geoffroyi (Fuessly, 1775)
 Gymnopleurus humanus MacLeay, 1821
 Gymnopleurus humeralis Klug, 1855
 Gymnopleurus hypocrita Balthasar, 1960
 Gymnopleurus ignitus Klug, 1855
 Gymnopleurus imitator Balthasar, 1963
 Gymnopleurus jacksoni Waterhouse, 1890
 Gymnopleurus koenigi (Fabricius, 1775)
 Gymnopleurus lacunosus Klug, 1845
 Gymnopleurus laevicollis Castelnau, 1840
 Gymnopleurus latreillei Castelnau, 1840
 Gymnopleurus leei (Fabricius, 1792)
 Gymnopleurus miliaris (Fabricius, 1775)
 Gymnopleurus mimus Balthasar, 1934
 Gymnopleurus moerens Kolbe, 1895
 Gymnopleurus mopsus (Pallas, 1781)
 Gymnopleurus naviauxi Montreuil, 2009
 Gymnopleurus nyankpalaensis Endrödi, 1976
 Gymnopleurus particolor Davis, 1986
 Gymnopleurus parvus MacLeay, 1821
 Gymnopleurus persianus Reitter, 1909
 Gymnopleurus plicatulus Fairmaire, 1890
 Gymnopleurus profanus (Fabricius, 1792)
 Gymnopleurus puncticollis Gillet, 1909
 Gymnopleurus purpureus Garreta, 1914
 Gymnopleurus pustulatus Kolbe, 1895
 Gymnopleurus qurosh Montreuil, 2011
 Gymnopleurus reichei Waterhouse, 1890
 Gymnopleurus rhodesianus Balthasar, 1963
 Gymnopleurus rotundatus Heer, 1862
 Gymnopleurus ruandensis Janssens, 1938
 Gymnopleurus sericeifrons Fairmaire, 1887
 Gymnopleurus sindensis Arrow, 1931
 Gymnopleurus sisyphus Heer, 1847
 Gymnopleurus somaliensis Lansberge, 1882
 Gymnopleurus sturmi MacLeay, 1821
 Gymnopleurus thelwalli Waterhouse, 1890
 Gymnopleurus thoracicus Harold, 1868
 Gymnopleurus tristis Castelnau, 1840
 Gymnopleurus tuxeni Petrovitz, 1955
 Gymnopleurus virens Erichson, 1843

Gallery

References

Scarabaeinae